Jhala is a Rajput clan. They are found in Rajasthan and Gujarat state of India. The clan is also found among Koli castes   as Jala.

The Jhalawar state ruled by Jhala Rajputs in Rajasthan was a 17-gun salute state, the princely state of Dhrangadhra was a 13-gun salute state in the 1920s, when it was ruled by members of the Jhala dynasty. At that time, Jhalas also governed in the 11-gun salute state of Wankaner and in the 9-gun salute states of Limbdi and Wadhwan, as well as in the non-salute states of Lakhtar, Sayla and Chuda.

References

Further reading 
 

Koli clans
Rajput clans of Gujarat